The Second Mori Cabinet governed Japan between July 2000 and April 2001 as a coalition government under the leadership of Prime Minister Yoshirō Mori of the Liberal Democratic Party. The cabinet was formed after the LDP-NKP-NCP coalition was returned to office with a substantially reduced majority in the June 25 general election, and inaugurated after Mori's re-election by the National Diet on July 4. Unlike his first cabinet, which retained all of former Prime Minister Keizō Obuchi's ministers, Mori introduced several personnel changes, although this was done with reference to LDP factions.

Mori Administration
Administrative reforms begun under Prime Minister Hashimoto came into effect during the Mori government's second term, resulting in the merger, renaming or creation of several ministries and cabinet posts. Two reshuffles of the second Mori Cabinet took place, the first in December 2000 in which a large number of ministers were replaced and ministerial portfolios were allocated in anticipation of the planned overhaul in government structures. Hashimoto was brought back into cabinet to oversee further government reforms. When the second reshuffle occurred one month later no ministers were moved, but instead the changes in ministries and offices came into effect. The powers of the Prime Minister's office were increased and the number of ministers was reduced through mergers, for example the Home Affairs, Management and Co-ordination, and Posts and Communications briefs were combined to become the Minister for Internal Affairs and Communications.

Mori was a deeply unpopular leader throughout his year-long term, with several gaffes, scandals and resignations of government and party figures causing his approval ratings to fall below 10 percent. At the end of 2000, several LDP members launched an abortive effort to remove Mori through a vote of no-confidence, this failed, though it further damaged his government's standing. In the spring of 2001, Mori announced that the election for LDP president would be brought forward from the autumn, which was in effect a resignation announcement since he was not expected to stand again for the leadership. Mori then confirmed his intention to stand down at the beginning of April and remained in office for several more weeks until Junichiro Koizumi was elected as his successor and became Prime Minister on April 26.

Election of the Prime Minister

Ministers 

R = Member of the House of Representatives
C = Member of the House of Councillors

Cabinet

Changes 
 July 30, 2000 - Chairman of the Financial Reconstruction Commission Kimitaka Kuze resigned as the result of a payments scandal and was replaced with Hideyuki Aizawa.
 October 27, 2000 - Chief Cabinet Secretary Hidenao Nakagawa resigned after being accused in the press of having connections to far-right groups, and of having an extramarital affair which led him to leak confidential information. He was replaced with Yasuo Fukuda.

First Reshuffled Cabinet

Second Reshuffled Cabinet

Changes 
 January 23, 2001 - Economic and Fiscal Policy Minister Fukushiro Nukaga resigned due to his involvement in a bribery scandal, and was replaced by Tarō Asō.

References

External links 
Pages at the Kantei (English website):
 Mori Administration 
 List of Ministers 
 List of Ministers (Reshuffled)

Cabinet of Japan
2000 establishments in Japan
2001 disestablishments in Japan
Cabinets established in 2000
Cabinets disestablished in 2001